Ujina 2-chōme is a Hiroden station (tram stop) on Hiroden Ujina Line in Minami-ku, Hiroshima.

Routes
From Ujina 2-chōme Station, there are three of Hiroden Streetcar routes.

 Hiroshima Station - Hiroshima Port Route
 Hiroden-nishi-hiroshima - Hiroshima Port Route
 Hiroshima Station - (via Hijiyama-shita) - Hiroshima Port Route

Connections
█ Ujina Line
  
Kenbyoin-mae — Ujina 2-chōme — Ujina 3-chōme

Around station
Hiroshima City Museum of History and Traditional Crafts

History
Opened as "Jyosen-mae" on December 27, 1935.
Closed from May 1942 to August 1945.
Reopened in August 1945.
Renamed to "Jyoshidai-mae" in 1950.
Renamed to "Ujina 13-chome" in 1953.
Renamed to the present name "Ujina 2-chome" on September 1, 1968.

See also
Hiroden Streetcar Lines and Routes
List of railway stations in Japan

References

Ujina 2-chome Station
Railway stations in Japan opened in 1935